Bradfield Canal is an inlet in Southeast Alaska, United States. It was first charted in 1793 by James Johnstone, one of George Vancouver's officers during his 1791–95 expedition. Vancouver later named it "Bradfield Channel".

References

Inlets of Alaska
Bodies of water of Wrangell, Alaska